Gorice is a village in the municipality of Sanski Most, Federation of Bosnia and Herzegovina, Bosnia and Herzegovina.

Demographics 
According to the 2013 census, its population was 615.

References

Villages in Bosnia and Herzegovina
Populated places in Sanski Most